Daouda Sow (born 19 January 1983 in Roubaix) is an amateur boxer from France.  He competed at the 2008 Summer Olympics in the lightweight division. Sow signed with the AIBA professional league, called AIBA Pro Boxing (APB), which launched in autumn of 2013.

Boxing career
At the first Olympic qualifier the southpaw lost to Ukrainian Oleksandr Klyuchko but qualified at the second tournament.
At Beijing he surprisingly medaled by beating Olympic silver medalist Kim Song-Guk, José Pedraza, local Hu Qing and 2005 world champ Yordenis Ugás and made it to the final. There he was edged out by Russian 2004 Olympic Champion Aleksei Tishchenko 9:11.

Olympic Games results 
2008 (as a lightweight)
Defeated Kim Song-Guk (North Korea) 13-3
Defeated José Pedraza (Puerto Rico) 13-9
Defeated Hu Qing (China) 9-6
Defeated Yordenis Ugás (Cuba) 15-8
Lost to Aleksei Tishchenko

World amateur championships results 
2007 (as a lightweight)
Lost to Romal Amanov (Azerbaijan) 6-19

References

External links
 
 
 
 

1983 births
Lightweight boxers
Boxers at the 2008 Summer Olympics
Olympic boxers of France
Olympic silver medalists for France
French sportspeople of Senegalese descent
Living people
Sportspeople from Roubaix
Olympic medalists in boxing
Medalists at the 2008 Summer Olympics
French male boxers